Sven Selånger (born Sven Ivan Eriksson, 19 March 1907 – 9 November 1992) was a Swedish Nordic skier. He competed at the 1928, 1932 and 1936 Olympics in the Nordic combined and ski jumping events and won a silver in the jumping in 1936. In 1932 he finished fourth in the jumping and fifth in the Nordic combined. He was the Swedish Olympic flag bearer in 1932 and 1936.

Selånger won ski jumping bronze medals at the 1931, 1933, and 1934 FIS Nordic World Ski Championships and a gold medal in the 1933 nordic combined event. He won the Holmenkollen ski festival's ski jumping competition in 1939, the first non-Norwegian to do so. In 1939, Selånger became the first non-Norwegian to receive the Holmenkollen medal. He also won the Svenska Dagbladet Gold Medal in 1939.

Selånger was a bandy player in the 1920s. He competed in skiing as Sven Eriksson until the 1936 Winter Olympics, and then changed his surname to Selånger, after his hometown, to avoid being confused with numerous other Swedes named Eriksson. In retirement he returned to bandy, as a player and coach for IK Viking, and worked as a sporting goods trader.

References

External links
. Nordic combined profile
. Ski jumping profile
Holmenkollen medalists – click Holmenkollmedaljen for downloadable pdf file 
Holmenkollen winners since 1892 – click Vinnere for downloadable pdf file 

1907 births
1992 deaths
People from Sundsvall
Swedish male ski jumpers
Swedish male Nordic combined skiers
Nordic combined skiers at the 1928 Winter Olympics
Nordic combined skiers at the 1932 Winter Olympics
Ski jumpers at the 1928 Winter Olympics
Ski jumpers at the 1932 Winter Olympics
Ski jumpers at the 1936 Winter Olympics
Olympic ski jumpers of Sweden
Olympic Nordic combined skiers of Sweden
Olympic silver medalists for Sweden
Holmenkollen medalists
Holmenkollen Ski Festival winners
Olympic medalists in ski jumping
FIS Nordic World Ski Championships medalists in Nordic combined
FIS Nordic World Ski Championships medalists in ski jumping
Medalists at the 1936 Winter Olympics
Sportspeople from Västernorrland County